1990 is a 1973 album by The Temptations for the Gordy (Motown) label, their final LP written and produced by Norman Whitfield.

Music and lyrics 
The LP was the center of a number of problems. The Temptations were dissatisfied with Whitfield's socially conscious message tracks, which were by now failing commercially, and desired to get back to singing ballads. Whitfield relented some here, placing message tracks such as "1990" and "Ain't No Justice" alongside love songs such as "Heavenly" and "You've Got My Soul on Fire".

Release and promotion 
The album's first single, the Rose Royce-backed and Dennis Edwards-led funk track "Let Your Hair Down", was its only Top 40 hit. The ballad "Heavenly", sung by Richard Street and Damon Harris, was caught in the center of a disc jockey boycott against Motown. A Motown executive did not thank the United States' DJs while accepting an award for the Temptations at the 1974 American Music Awards, and, as a result, the DJs refused to play "Heavenly". "You've Got My Soul on Fire", another Edwards-led funk track, also stalled out on the pop charts.

The Temptations remained dissatisfied with Whitfield's "slave-driver" like production mentality and his tendency to overshadow the Temptations' contributions to their own records by emphasising his production techniques and creating extended instrumental tracks with only a few verses of vocals. Group leader Otis Williams complained to Motown chief Berry Gordy, who replaced Whitfield with Jeffrey Bowen for their next LP, 1975's A Song for You. Whitfield left Motown soon afterward, and started his own label, Whitfield Records, which released several hits from Rose Royce.

Critical reception 

Reviewing in Christgau's Record Guide: Rock Albums of the Seventies (1981), Robert Christgau wrote: "Not only isn't this good Motown, it isn't good Motown psychedelic—except for some sharp strumming on the title track (a half-assed indictment of/tribute to America) it never takes off rhythmically or vocally."

Track listing
All tracks written and produced by Norman Whitfield.

Side one
"Let Your Hair Down" – 2:40 (lead singer: Dennis Edwards)
"I Need You" – 3:05 (lead singer: Damon Harris)
"Heavenly" – 3:57 (lead singers: Richard Street, Damon Harris)
"You've Got My Soul on Fire" – 3:53 (lead singer: Dennis Edwards)
"Ain't No Justice" – 6:08 (lead singer: Richard Street, Melvin Franklin, Damon Harris, Dennis Edwards)

Side two
"1990" – 4:06 (lead singer: Dennis Edwards)
"Zoom" – 13:42 (lead singers: Dennis Edwards, Richard Street, Melvin Franklin, Damon Harris, Otis Williams)

Personnel
 Dennis Edwards – vocals
 Damon Harris – vocals
 Richard Street – vocals
 Melvin Franklin – vocals
 Otis Williams – vocals
 Norman Whitfield – producer
 The Funk Brothers and Rose Royce – instrumentation

Charts

References

1973 albums
Gordy Records albums
The Temptations albums
Albums produced by Norman Whitfield
Psychedelic soul albums